Nazarovo is a rural locality (a village) in Vorshinskoye Rural Settlement, Sobinsky District, Vladimir Oblast, Russia. The population was 10 as of 2010.

Geography 
Nazarovo is located 30 km northeast of Sobinka (the district's administrative centre) by road. Batyushkovo is the nearest rural locality.

References 

Rural localities in Sobinsky District